Carolina is a 1934 American pre-Code romantic comedy film directed by Henry King, with a screenplay by Reginald Berkley based on the 1931 play The House of Connelly by Paul Green, and starring Janet Gaynor, Lionel Barrymore, and Robert Young. The supporting cast features Stepin Fetchit and Shirley Temple in a romanticized story about a post-Civil War family in the fading Southern United States, who is regaining its former prestige.

Cast

Janet Gaynor as Joanna Tate
Lionel Barrymore as Bob Connelly
Robert Young as Will Cromwell
Henrietta Crosman as Mrs. Ellen Connelly
Richard Cromwell as Alan
Mona Barrie as Virginia Buchanan
Stepin Fetchit as Scipio
Ronnie Cosby as Harry Tate
Jackie Cosbey as Jackie Tate
Almeda Fowler as Geraldine Connelly
Alden "Stephen" Chase as Jack Hampton
Shirley Temple as Joan Connelly (uncredited)

Production

See also
Lionel Barrymore filmography

References

External links
 
 

1930s historical comedy films
1934 romantic comedy films
1934 films
American historical comedy films
Films set in the Southern United States
American black-and-white films
American films based on plays
Films directed by Henry King
Fox Film films
American romantic comedy films
American historical romance films
1930s historical romance films
1930s American films
Silent romantic comedy films